The 1956 Santiago rail crash occurred on February 14, 1956, at 4:00 a.m. near the Chilean capital Santiago on the branch to Cartagena and killed 23 people.

Two trains left the capital twelve minutes apart. Seven kilometres into their journeys, the second train ran into the back of the first; destroying a wooden, third-class carriage. 23 people were killed and 198 injured. President Carlos Ibáñez del Campo ordered an immediate enquiry; the driver of the rear train was found to be at fault.

The accident happened just seven months after a very similar accident at San Bernardo twenty kilometers south of the city killed 38 people.

Ghost train sightings

Several years after the accident, several Maipú residents started to report hearing what sounds like a train horn, which seems to come from the track nearby Avenida 5 de Abril, Most of them said that when they go outside, there is nothing. this train horn seems to be loud, as residents from other communes like Lo Espejo, Pudahuel, Quinta Normal and even Santiago Centro reported hearing the same noise. Many believe it's the souls of those who passed on the accident, trying to reach Cartagena to end their travesy (pass on to peace).

Sources
Accidente de Queronque (in Spanish)
Trenes sobre rieles: Tragedias en la via (in Spanish)

References

Railway accidents involving fog
History of Santiago Metropolitan Region
Train collisions in Chile
Railway accidents in 1956
1956 in Chile
Transport in Santiago Metropolitan Region
February 1956 events in South America
1956 disasters in Chile